James Hanley (born 1965) is an Irish painter and designer.

Life and work
Hanley graduated from University College Dublin in 1987 with a degree in History of Art and English, and from the National College of Art and Design in 1991 with a BA in Fine Art Painting. He works in a naturalistic style and has exhibited widely in his native Ireland. He is on the Board of Governors of the National Gallery of Ireland and is a member of Aosdána, and also a member and previous Secretary of the Royal Hibernian Academy. He is married to Órla Dukes.

In 1996 he accompanied the Irish Defence Forces to Bosnia and Croatia to research a painting commissioned to commemorate Ireland's presidency of the European Union Monitoring Mission in former Yugoslavia. This now hangs in the military college, Curragh Camp. In 2006 he designed a coin to mark the 175th anniversary of the Irish Office of Public Works. In 2007 he was the artist in residence at the Centre cultural irlandais de Paris. He was commissioned by the Irish post office to design three Christmas stamps for 2008. He has lectured and taught painting and drawing classes regularly at the National Gallery of Ireland since 1990.

References

External sources
"James Hanley Curriculum Vitae"; Jameshanley.net. Retrieved 11 February 2011.
Hanley, James (2009); Comhghall Casy – Studies in Still Life"; Irish Arts Review. Retrieved 13 February 2011

1965 births
20th-century Irish painters
21st-century Irish painters
Irish male painters
Living people
Alumni of the National College of Art and Design
20th-century Irish male artists